John Sibley Williams (born December 7, 1978, in Melrose, Massachusetts) is an American poet, educator, and literary agent. He is the author of "As One Fire Consumes Another" (winner of the 2018 Orison Poetry Prize), "Skin Memory" (winner of the 2018 Backwaters Poetry Prize, "Disinheritance", and "Controlled Hallucinations", as well as six chapbooks. He has edited three regional poetry collections and works as editor of the poetry journal The Inflectionist Review.

Life 

Williams received a B.A. from the University at Albany, SUNY in 2003 and an M.A. in creative writing in 2005 from Rivier University. After traveling abroad for three years, he moved to Portland, Oregon in 2009 and earned his M.A. in Book Publishing from Portland State University. There he worked as Acquisitions Manager of Ooligan Press at Portland State University and was instrumental in the production of the Alive at the Center, the Pacific Poetry Project's first volume poetry anthology.

In 2012, Williams and fellow poets A. Molotkov and David Cooke became co-directors of the Walt Whitman 150 organization, a biannual celebration of Whitman's legacy. The following year, he and Molotkov started The Inflectionist Review, an international poetry and art magazine.

His work has appeared over 500 journals, including The Yale Review, Southern Review, Colorado Review, Prairie Schooner, The Massachusetts Review, Midwest Quarterly, Poetry Northwest, Atlanta Review, Third Coast, RHINO, and various anthologies.

Williams lives in Milwaukie, Oregon with his wife, twin toddlers, Boston terrier, and three cats.

Works

Full-length collections

As One Fire Consumes Another], Orison Books, 2019
Skin Memory], Backwaters Press, 2019
Disinheritance], Apprentice House 2016.
Controlled Hallucinations], FutureCycle Press, 2013

Chapbooks

Motionless from the Iron Bridge: A Northwest Anthology of Bridge Poems], Barebone Books, 2013 (editor)
The End of Mythology, Virgogray Press, 2013
The Longest Compass, Finishing Line Press, 2012
Folded Word Press, 2012
Autobiography of Fever, Bedouin Books, 2011
The Art of Raining, The Knives Forks and Spoons Press, 2011
Door, Door, Red Ochre Press, 2011
A Pure River, The Last Automat Press, 2010

Awards

A nineteen-time Pushcart nominee, Williamsis the winner of numerous awards, including the Philip Booth Award, American Literary Review Poetry Contest, Phyllis Smart-Young Prize, The 46er Prize, Nancy D. Hargrove Editors' Prize, Confrontation Poetry Prize, and Laux/Millar Prize.

Reviews

References

External links 
 http://johnsibleywilliams.com/
 Controlled Hallucinations
 The Inflectionist Review
 Walt Whitman 150

American male poets
Writers from Oregon
1978 births
Living people
People from Milwaukie, Oregon
Portland State University alumni
Rivier University alumni
University at Albany, SUNY alumni
21st-century American poets
21st-century American male writers